Shake Rag is an unincorporated community in Forsyth and Fulton counties, in the U.S. state of Georgia.

History
Variant names are "Shakerag" and "Sheltonville". A post office called Sheltonville was established in 1848, and remained in operation until 1907. The name "Shake Rag" refers to a cloth held out as a signal for example to stop a train.

References

Unincorporated communities in Georgia (U.S. state)
Unincorporated communities in Forsyth County, Georgia
Unincorporated communities in Fulton County, Georgia